One Gallant Rush: Robert Gould Shaw and His Brave Black Regiment (1965) is a book by Peter Burchard, based on letters written by Robert Gould Shaw, white colonel of the first black regiment in the Union Army during the American Civil War, the 54th Massachusetts Regiment. They were the first of what became the United States Colored Troops. Nearly 200,000 African Americans fought in the war.

Legacy
The book was adapted for the film Glory, released in 1989 and starring Matthew Broderick, Denzel Washington and Morgan Freeman. The 54th established a standard of loyalty and heroism. The book was re-issued in 1990 as a tie-in to the movie, which won several Academy Awards and other recognition.

External links
Internet Movie Database pn Peter Burchard

1965 non-fiction books
History books about the American Civil War